The 2005 AFC President's Cup was the inaugural season of the AFC President's Cup, a competition for football clubs in countries categorized as "emerging nations" by the Asian Football Confederation. The eight teams that competed were split into two groups and played each other team in their group once. The winner of each group then played the runner up in the other group in the semifinals, and the winners of the semifinal matches played in the final match to determine the winner. There was no third place match. The games were played in May 2005 and were held in Kathmandu, Nepal.

Qualified teams

Notes

Venues

Group stage

Group A

Group B

Semi-finals

Finals

References

External links
2005 AFC President's Cup
2005 AFC President's Cup Results
2005 AFC President's Cup on Kantipur Online

2005 in Asian football
2005
2005
2005 in Bhutanese football
2005 in Cambodian football
2005 in Taiwanese football
2005 in Kyrgyzstani football
2005 in Tajikistani football
2004–05 in Pakistani football
2005 in Nepalese sport
Sport in Kathmandu